Atachycines is a genus of cave or camel crickets in the subfamily Aemodogryllinae; the genus has not been assigned to any tribe.  Originating in Asia, species have been found in Borneo, the Indo-China region and Japan.

Species
The Orthoptera Species File lists:
Atachycines apicalis Brunner von Wattenwyl, 1888 – type species (as Diestrammena horazumi Furukawa = A. apicalis subsp. apicalis)
Atachycines minuta Chopard, 1916
Atachycines mjobergi Chopard, 1937

References

External links

Ensifera genera
Rhaphidophoridae
Orthoptera of Indo-China